Mark J. F. Schroeder (born December 13, 1955) is an American politician who currently serves as the Commissioner of the New York State Department of Motor Vehicles.

Early life and education 
Schroeder was raised in South Buffalo, where he attended Public School #72, St. Thomas Aquinas School, and Bishop Timon – St. Jude High School. He received an A.A.S. degree from SUNY Erie in 1976, and a B.S. degree from Empire State College in 1982.

Career

Erie County Legislature 
In 2001, Schroeder ran for an open seat in the Erie County Legislature against conservative Joe Kelly of South Buffalo. As a County Legislator, he started the Greater South Buffalo Chamber of Commerce, which currently has more than 200 members and holds several community events every year. That same year, Schroeder founded the South Buffalo Education Center, which offers G.E.D. classes and computer and vocational training, helping more than 500 students receive their GEDs since 2002.

New York State Assembly 
Schroeder was first elected to the Assembly in November 2004 and he was re-elected in November 2006. He won the November 2008 general election with 75 percent of the vote and ran uncontested in the November 2010 general election.

In 2010, Schroeder indicated he would not vote for Sheldon Silver as Speaker of the New York State Assembly, although both are Democrats.

Buffalo City Comptroller 
In June 2011, he expressed interest in running for the position of Buffalo City Comptroller, which had been recently vacated by Andrew SanFilippo when he was appointed New York State Deputy Comptroller. He was expected to face opposition in a Democratic primary from Erie County Legislature Majority Leader Maria Whyte, but she withdrew from the race to instead run in a special election for Erie County Clerk. In November 2011, Schroeder was elected Buffalo City Comptroller, he was unopposed.

New York DMV Commissioner 
On December 30, 2018, Schroeder announced he will be resigning from the City Comptroller's office to become the Commissioner of the New York State Department of Motor Vehicles.

Personal life
Schroeder resides in South Buffalo with his wife, Kathleen (née Horan), and their three children.

References

External links
Mark J.F. Schroeder, official campaign website

|-

1955 births
Living people
County legislators in New York (state)
Democratic Party members of the New York State Assembly
Comptrollers of Buffalo, New York
SUNY Erie alumni
Empire State College alumni
21st-century American politicians